"Burning Gold" is a song recorded by American singer-songwriter Christina Perri for her second studio album, Head or Heart (2014). The song was written by Perri and Kid Harpoon and produced by John Hill and Butch Walker. It was first released through the iTunes Store as a promotional single for Head or Heart on March 11, 2014, and was subsequently released as the second official single from the album on June 9, 2014. The song was used on seventh episode of second season of the American TV series, The Fosters.

Content
"Burning Gold" is a pop rock song with a moderate tempo and a duration of three minutes and forty-four seconds. It is composed in the key of G major, with a vocal range of E3—E5. As with previous single, "Human", the song's instrumentation consists primarily of piano, but "Burning Gold" also incorporates a ukulele and drums. Mike Wass at Idolator compared the song favorably to contemporary Sara Bareilles' hit "Brave" due to its "uplifting" subject matter and "infectious" arrangement.

Track listings
Digital download
 "Burning Gold" — 3:44

Burning Gold Remixes — EP
 "Burning Gold (Grouplove & Captain Cuts Remix)" — 3:47
 "Burning Gold (Bit Funk Remix)" — 4:52
 "Burning Gold (Addal Remix)" — 4:52
 "Burning Gold (Autograf Remix)" — 5:33
 "Burning Gold (Stint Remix)" — 3:44

Music video
The official music video for "Burning Gold" was directed by Jay Martin and premiered August 1, 2014.

Chart performance
"Burning Gold" debuted at number 39 on the Billboard Adult Pop Songs chart for the week ending August 9, 2014.

References

External links
 Official "Burning Gold" Music video on YouTube

2013 songs
2014 singles
Christina Perri songs
Atlantic Records singles
Songs written by Kid Harpoon
Song recordings produced by Butch Walker
Songs written by Christina Perri